Zwodau is the German name of:
 Svatava, a river flowing through the Czech Republic and Germany
 Svatava (Sokolov District), a market town in Sokolov District, Czech Republic